The Voie Sacrée ("Sacred Way") is a road that connects Bar-le-Duc to Verdun (Meuse), France. It was given its name because of the vital role it played during the Battle of Verdun in World War I.

Use during WWI 
During the initial crisis of 21 February to 22 March, 600 trucks per day had already delivered 48,000 tons of ammunition, 6,400 tons of other material and 263,000 men to the battlefield. Beginning on February 21, all horse drawn traffic and troop movements on foot had been ordered off the road leaving it open for truck and motor car traffic only. After March 1916, one truck passed every 14 seconds, submitting the road to considerable wear and tear. Quarries had to be opened nearby to supply the road with crushed stone. Over the course of ten months, 16 labour battalions worked to keep the road in good shape and order. The road had been recognized since 1915 as the only reliable vehicular road that remained in existence to supply Verdun safely. All the standard gauge railway lines that could reach Verdun had already been interrupted by German forces in late 1914. To compensate for this precarious situation the road had been widened to 23 feet during 1915, so it could accommodate the continuous up and down flow of two lines of truck traffic. This preemptive roadway improvement in 1915, plus success in organizing the transport system on the road (a mission supervised by colonel Maurice de Barescut, the Chief of Staff of the French Second Army), is what saved Verdun in 1916.

A special unit responsible for controlling traffic and servicing the vehicles numbered 300 officers and 8,500 men. The rolling stock was made up of 3500 Berliet and Renault trucks plus 800 ambulances, the latter often being Ford Model T's. Thirty breakdown trucks remained on the road at all times with repair crews stationed besides them. Any disabled vehicle was immediately moved to the roadside so as not to interrupt the flow of traffic. Automobile repair shops in Bar-le-Duc and Troyes worked ceaselessly as did hydraulic presses that renewed the truck's solid rubber tyres.  

The , a narrow-gauge single track railway, ran parallel to the roadside and was able to move 1,800 tons of supplies per day. This included the bulk of the food for the army at Verdun - some 16,600 officers, 420,000 men, and 136,000 horses - and brought back many wounded from the front. Beginning in March 1916, a standard gauge railway bypass was placed under accelerated construction: the Sommeilles-Nettancourt to Dugny line. During the summer of 1916 it would reconnect Verdun to the regional standard gauge network.

Nowadays 
The Voie Sacrée still exists but it has been paved-over and is now an active secondary road. In 2006, the route was renumbered RD1916, a reference to the road's most critical year. The city hall in the village of Souilly, on the Voie Sacrée, served as headquarters to Generals Philippe Pétain and Robert Nivelle during the Battle of Verdun. A large, well-preserved, two-storey stone building fronting on the "Voie Sacree", the Souilly city hall is still in official use today. Several plaques on its facade remind the visitor of the historic role it played in 1916 during the Battle of Verdun and, later in 1918, during the Meuse-Argonne Offensive.

See also
 Zone rouge
 Voie Sacrée wind farm

Further reading
 Gen.Allain Bernede,"Verdun 1916:un choix strategique, une equation logistique". in : Revue historique des Armees,242,2006.
 Jacques-Henri Lefevre. "Verdun,La plus grande bataille de l'Histoire",G.Durassie et Cie,Paris,1960

                                                                                                                                                                                                 

Western Front (World War I)
Meuse (department)
Transport in Grand Est
Military history of Lorraine
Roads in France